The Lady of the Wheel (La Ruotaia) is a 2012 historical fiction novel by Sicilian American author Angelo F. Coniglio. The book follows the life of a girl who was abandoned as an infant, with the major themes of the book including poverty, exploitation and family values.  Coniglio's work has been compared to the verismo (realism) of Sicilian author Giovanni Verga.

Plot summary
A mother abandons an infant girl, placing her inside a 'foundling wheel' to be cared for in a foundling home, and the woman's husband gives up a young son as a carusu, a virtual slave in a sulfur mine; both actions intended to help the remaining family to survive in poverty-stricken Racalmuto, in late-1800s Sicily.  It was common for families to give up their boys at the age of five as carusi, selling them to the mining company for life for a small price, and the parents treat it matter-of-factly as a regrettable but unavoidable decision.  The plot follows the girl's life as a foundling, and her brother's labors in the mine, working ten-hour days in hellish conditions, and their interactions with family and co-workers.  As plot devices, the author includes examples of Napoleon-inspired recording of civil documents, and describes the Sicilian conventions for selecting the given names of a family's children.

Characters
 Rosa Esposto - the protagonist, an abandoned child
 Maria Rizzo - Rosa's mother
 Antonino 'Nino' Alessi- Rosa's father, a pick-man in a sulfur mine
 Anna di Marco - 'la Ruotaia', the receiver of abandoned infants left in the town's 'foundling wheel'
 Salvatore 'Totò' Alessi - Rosa's eldest brother, a "carusu" or mine-boy in a sulfur mine
 Gaetano 'Tanuzzu' Alessi - another brother of Rosa's
 Pietro 'Petruzzu' Castiglione - the son of the mayor of Racalmuto

References

External links
 Forever Young magazine article
 Dr. Kenneth Scambray's review of The Lady of the Wheel.

2012 American novels

Novels set in Sicily
Adoption, fostering, orphan care and displacement
Sulfur mining
American historical novels
Novels set in the 19th century